Jaime Silva Gómez (10 October 1935 – 25 April 2003) was a Colombian footballer. He competed for the Colombia national football team at the 1962 FIFA World Cup which was held in Chile.

Career
Born in Bogota, Silva played club football for Santa Fe, Deportivo Cali and Deportes Tolima. After he finishing playing football, he managed Cúcuta Deportivo and the Colombia national under-20 football team at the 1983 South American Youth Championship in Bolivia.

References

1935 births
2003 deaths
Colombian footballers
Colombia international footballers
1962 FIFA World Cup players
Categoría Primera A players
Independiente Santa Fe footballers
Deportivo Cali footballers
Deportes Tolima footballers
Colombian football managers
Once Caldas managers
Association football midfielders
Footballers from Bogotá